Rugby league is a sport played in Wales.  The governing body of the game in Wales is the Wales Rugby League.

There is a long but sporadic history of rugby league in Wales. Over the decades hundreds of Welsh players have played for the leading English clubs. Consequently, the national side, nicknamed the Dragons, have often been a very strong force in the international game.

History

Rugby football was an increasingly popular sport for Wales in the 1890s, and particularly in the south where its popularity surpassed that of association football. The Welsh coal miners shared the same working class ethos of the miners from the northern counties of England. The impending schism of 1895 tore apart the English rugby union and in the early 1900s, the shock waves were being felt in rugby worldwide, though there was little desire in Wales to embrace professionalism. Amateurism in Wales was seen as a means of holding together a community in which there were expectations by the public on their sportsman to not turn their back on international rugby. The Welsh took pride in the position rugby gave them in the sporting world, and therefore the Welsh Rugby Union saw little attraction in turning professional.

Nonetheless, many Welsh players signed for English clubs. The Northern Union's administrators began to ponder the possibilities of international competitions against an English representative side. The first attempt met with a lack of public interest, and the first scheduled Northern Union international, also became the first postponed Northern Union international. It was rescheduled for the 5 April 1904. The team opposing England was labelled Other Nationalities and consisted of Welshmen and a few Scots. The Other Nationalities proved too strong, defeating the English 9 - 3. In 1905, England gained back some credibility with a 21 - 11 win.

In 1907 a professional version of the "All Blacks" rugby team from New Zealand (nicknamed the All Golds by Australian press) toured England in what became the first set of international games played under the new NU rules. The All Golds had not played under the Northern Union rules and underwent a week of intensive training. The first Wales international league game took place at Aberdare on 1 January 1908 played against the All Golds. Wales went on to defeat New Zealand 9-8, the winning try scored by former Wales rugby union international Dai Jones.

In 1907, the Welsh Northern Union was formed in Wrexham, but the Northern Union refused it affiliation as they wanted the body located in the South of Wales and the WNU soon folded. In 1907 two Welsh clubs Ebbw Vale RLFC and Merthyr Tydfil RLFC joined the Northern Union and also competed in the Challenge Cup.

In the 1908-09 season, there were sufficient numbers of Welsh clubs to run a separate Welsh League section of the competition, alongside the Northern Union's Yorkshire and Lancashire Leagues. The Welsh League lasted only two seasons before folding in 1910 after most of the competing teams disbanded.

In 1926, the RFL formed a Welsh commission in an attempt to convert rugby union clubs to rugby league.

From 1949 to 1955 a Welsh league was run by the Welsh commission but it was disbanded due to lack of interest and finance. Founder members were Neath, Cardiff, Llanelli, Bridgend, Ystradgynlais, Aberavon, Amman Vale and Blaina.

Harsh economic times in the 1980s meant that rugby union players such as Jonathan Davies and Scott Gibbs "went north" to play professional rugby league in order to earn a living. This flow of players was halted when rugby union became professional in 1995.

In the early 21st century rugby league gained in popularity in Wales. Matches between teams in the Welsh Premier division generally draw crowds of around 300 spectators.

With the Rugby League Conference’s growth throughout England, the RFL and its WRL arm set up an amateur club, the Cardiff Demons who joined the Central South Division of the Rugby League Conference in 2001. The Demons, who were mainly made up of former players from the university UWIC rugby league club, were quite successful and instantly saw interest from other parts of Wales grow.

In 2002, two former students of Swansea University decided to set up a local club called the Swansea Bulls, now Swansea Valley Miners, with a view to playing friendly matches against the Demons and other touring clubs. Peter Thomas and Gareth Jones, both former Welsh Student RL team members, started an amateur team out of the Morriston R.F.C. ground with a mixture of university and local union players. Junior teams soon started playing league and one team, coached by Neville Price, was coached by the Bradford Bulls team coaches on a weekend tour.

The following year, the RFL decided to expand, letting in six more open-age sides to form the Welsh division of the Rugby League Conference with North Wales Coasters playing in one of the English divisions.

During the reconstruction of Wembley stadium the Challenge Cup final was played at Cardiff's Millennium Stadium and one year a reported 15,000 tickets were sold in Wales out of an overall attendance of around 70,000. The record attendance for any rugby league game in Wales was set in 2005 with 74,213 attending the Challenge Cup final in Cardiff.

Wales Rugby League achieved governing body status in 2005 and employed its first professional chairman, Mark Rowley, in 2006.

The Rugby Football League (RFL) took an entire round of Super League matches to the Millennium Stadium in Cardiff, Wales on the weekend of 5–6 May 2007. This was called Millennium Magic.

Governing body

The Rugby Football League were the governing body for rugby league in the UK. They were formed as the Northern Rugby Union in 1895.

In 1907, the Welsh Northern Union was formed in Wrexham, but the Northern Union refused it affiliation as they wanted the body located in the South of Wales, which is the heartland of Welsh rugby union, and the WNU soon folded.

In 1926, the newly renamed RFL formed a Welsh commission in an attempt to convert rugby union clubs to rugby league.

The Wales Rugby League was formed in 1995 and recognised at that time as the governing body of rugby league in Wales by the Rugby Football League, the British Amateur Rugby League Association and the Welsh Sports Council. It employed its first professional chairman, Mark Rowley, in 2006.

Wales became the 12th full member of the Rugby League International Federation following a meeting of the Federation board in Melbourne in May 2010.

Welsh professional clubs

There have been various attempts to introduce professional rugby league to Wales throughout the 20th century. Merthyr Tydfil and Ebbw Vale joined for the 1907/08 season; followed closely behind Aberdare, Barry, Mid-Rhondda and Treherbert joined in 1908/09. The 1908/09 season saw the first Welsh League, played alongside the Northern Union League.

Aberdare, Barry, and Mid-Rhondda dropped out after that season, with Treherbert following the next year. Merthyr Tydfil lasted until 1910/11, and Ebbw Vale was the last of these to leave, after 1911/12. The next Welsh club was Pontypridd, who joined in 1926/27; only to dropped out after 8 games of the 1927/28 season. A Cardiff club participated in the 1951/52 season, but disbanded after that season.

Following the example of Fulham F.C. (who founded the RL team that is now London Broncos), Cardiff City F.C. decided to enter a team for the 1981/82 season. The Blue Dragons, as they were known, shared Ninian Park with the Bluebirds until the 1983/84 season, when the club went into liquidation. They were then moved to Bridgend for the 1984/85 season, where they placed on the bottom of the table, and were expelled after the season for failing to obtain a home ground. Another attempt to establish a professional rugby league club was made in the 1990s. South Wales finished 6th in the Second Division in 1996, and, because of small crowds, withdrew from the league before the following season.

There are now two professional rugby league clubs in Wales. The Crusaders Rugby League team, based in Wrexham, played in the Super League competition up until 2011. After going into administration they have become North Wales Crusaders. The second club is Llanelli-based West Wales Raiders established in 2017 following the demise of the South Wales Ironmen side which were based in Merthyr Tydfil.  Both teams currently play in League 1.

Current RFL and BARLA teams
The following is a list of current Welsh rugby league clubs with Wikipedia articles along with the league they play in:

Men's
North Wales Crusaders (League 1)
Torfaen Tigers, Valley Cougars (Conference League South)
Conwy Celts, Dee Valley Dragons, Flintshire Falcons, Prestatyn and Rhyl Panthers, Wrexham Bradley Raiders (North Wales Conference)
Bridgend Blue Bulls (South Wales Premiership)

Women's
Cardiff Demons (Super League South)

Competitions and League System

Senior
Club rugby league in Wales is played in a full British league system operated by the Rugby Football League. The South Wales Conference and North Wales Conference are the highest tier exclusive Welsh division of the league system and are currently 5th tier in the league pyramid. Wales currently has two professional clubs who compete in the RFL, North Wales Crusaders and West Wales Raiders.

Junior
Wales's junior competition is the Welsh Conference Junior League. In 2011 there was a North Wales Under 12 league. In the Conference Youth League there were two Welsh sides: North Wales Crusaders and CPC Bears.

National team

Wales participated in the first ever rugby league international when they beat New Zealand 9-8 in Aberdare in 1908.

The national side, nicknamed the Dragons, have often been one of the stronger sides in international rugby league and have also provided a number of players for the Great Britain team. The two great eras of Welsh Rugby League coincide with the playing careers of Jim Sullivan and Jonathan Davies. They compete in the Rugby League European Nations Cup and the Rugby League World Cup.

There is a very successful Wales A team selected from domestic Welsh players, which competes in the Amateur Four Nations competition. Wales have won seven of the eight tournaments played.

Wales also play in regular international tournaments at under 19, under 15 and student level.

Media
BBC Sport own the rights to broadcast a highlights package called the Super League Show which was first broadcast in Wales in 2008. Prior to this it had only been broadcast in the North of England. Rugby League Raw is not broadcast in Wales despite the BBC owning the rights to do so. The BBC covers the Rugby League Challenge Cup from the rounds in which the top clubs enter.

Highlights of Crusaders games were shown on the rugby union programme ScrumV and their home games can be seen on Y Clwb Rygbi 13 on S4C. The BBC covers the Rugby League Challenge Cup from the rounds in which the top clubs enter.

BBC Radio Five Live and BBC Five Live Sports Extra carry commentary from a selection of Super League matches each week. GTFM carries a weekly rugby league spot throughout the season on their Saturday afternoon "The Season Ticket" show.

Live Super League and National Rugby League games are shown on Sky Sports Arena with highlights also being shown on the channel. From the 2022 season, 10 live Super League games per season will be shown on Channel 4, the first time the league will be shown on terrestrial television. Championship games are shown on Premier Sports, with one game a week being aird.

See also

 Rugby league in the British Isles
 British Rugby League Hall of Fame
 List of Wales national rugby league team players
 Wales national rugby league team match results

References

Further reading

External links

 Wales Rugby League
  First RL International
 Wales History
 South Wales Thunder RL